Harpalus (Ancient Greek: Ἁρπάλου), in Greek mythology, was a Spartan prince as the son of King Amyclas of Laconia, and possibly Diomede, daughter of Lapithes. Through this parentage, he was considered to be the brother of King Argalus, King Cynortes, Hyacinthus, Polyboea, Laodamia (or Leanira), Hegesandre, and in other versions, of Daphne. 

Harpalus was the father of Deritus, ancestor of Patreus, founder of Patras.

Notes

Princes in Greek mythology
Laconian characters in Greek mythology
Laconian mythology
Mythology of Achaea

References 

 Apollodorus, The Library with an English Translation by Sir James George Frazer, F.B.A., F.R.S. in 2 Volumes, Cambridge, MA, Harvard University Press; London, William Heinemann Ltd. 1921. ISBN 0-674-99135-4. Online version at the Perseus Digital Library. Greek text available from the same website.
 Parthenius, Love Romances translated by Sir Stephen Gaselee (1882-1943), S. Loeb Classical Library Volume 69. Cambridge, MA. Harvard University Press. 1916.  Online version at the Topos Text Project.
 Parthenius, Erotici Scriptores Graeci, Vol. 1. Rudolf Hercher. in aedibus B. G. Teubneri. Leipzig. 1858. Greek text available at the Perseus Digital Library.
 Pausanias, Description of Greece with an English Translation by W.H.S. Jones, Litt.D., and H.A. Ormerod, M.A., in 4 Volumes. Cambridge, MA, Harvard University Press; London, William Heinemann Ltd. 1918. . Online version at the Perseus Digital Library
 Pausanias, Graeciae Descriptio. 3 vols. Leipzig, Teubner. 1903.  Greek text available at the Perseus Digital Library.